Péter Vánky (born 28 June 1968) is a Romanian-born Swedish fencer. He competed in the épée events at the 1988, 1992, 1996 and 2000 Summer Olympics.

References

External links
 

1968 births
Living people
Swedish male épée fencers
Olympic fencers of Sweden
Fencers at the 1988 Summer Olympics
Fencers at the 1992 Summer Olympics
Fencers at the 1996 Summer Olympics
Fencers at the 2000 Summer Olympics
Sportspeople from Târgu Mureș
Swedish people of Hungarian descent
Romanian emigrants to Sweden